Syrene Louise Primrose "Prim" Rupp Hinton (December 25, 1889 - May 9, 1969) was an American journalist. She was the society editor for the Aberdeen Daily World.

Early life
Syrene Louise Primrose "Prim" Rupp Hinton was born on December 25, 1889, in Adrian, Michigan, the daughter of Bernard Henry Rupp (1847-1929) and Sarah E Hinman (1853-1937). The family moved to Walla Walla, Washington, when she was four years old. She went to Sharpstein school for several years and then to Lincoln, from which school she graduated.

She was a graduate of Whitman College.

Career
She was a teacher of English in Weatherwax High School, Aberdeen, Washington.

She was the society editor for the Aberdeen Daily World. Her brother W.A. Rupp was the publisher of the newspaper from 1908 to 1963. Her second husband Foelkner was the publisher from 1963 to 1967.

She was a member of the Grays Harbor Woman's Club.

Personal life
Primrose Rupp Hinton lived at 223 West Fifth Street, Aberdeen, Washington. On June 16, 1920, she married Leonard Arthur Hinton. She later divorced and married Peter Phillip Foelkner (1895-1974) on November 12, 1937. Foelkner was the business manager of the Aberdeen Daily World.

She died on May 9, 1969, and is buried with her second husband at Fern Hill Cemetery, Aberdeen, Washington.

References

1889 births
People from Adrian, Michigan
1969 deaths
20th-century American educators
Educators from Michigan
20th-century American women educators
Women's page journalists